I Am Emma is a 2002 Italian comedy film directed by Francesco Falaschi.

The movie was nominated for a David di Donatello and a Silver Ribbon for Best New Director in 2003.

Cast
Cecilia Dazzi as Emma
Marco Giallini as Roberto
Pierfrancesco Favino as Carlo
Elda Alvignini as Marta
Nicola Siri as Daniele
Luigi Diberti as Marcello
Claudia Coli as Elisa
Federico Marinacci as Emilio

References

External links

2002 films
2000s Italian-language films
2002 comedy films
Italian comedy films
Films directed by Francesco Falaschi
Films set in Tuscany
Films shot in Tuscany